India's Got Talent season 8 started on 20 October 2018. Actress Malaika Arora Khan, director and producer Karan Johar, and veteran actress Kirron Kher returned as the judges. Close-up magician Javed Khan was announced as the winner on 29 December 2018.

The eighth season of India's Got Talent premieres on 20 October 2018. Bharti Singh returned to present the show. Rithvik Dhanjani also hosted the show, while Gunjan Joshi joined the show as a writer.

Season Overview 

  |  | 
  |  Golden Buzzer Audition |  Public Wildcard

Golden Buzzer Summary 
The golden buzzer returned for its fourth series. This year the golden buzzer acts will go straight to "Semi-Finals". For the first time, the hosts were also allowed to use the Golden Buzzer for an act.

Semi Finals Summary 

  Buzzed |  Judges' Vote |  (Advanced to Pre-Finale)
  (Advanced to Pre-Finale)

Semi Final 1 (9 December) 
Special Guests: Riteish Deshmukh & Saiyami Kher

Semi Final 2 (15 December) 
Special Guests: Katrina Kaif & Anushka Sharma

Semi Final 3 (16 December)

Semi Final 4 (22 December) 
Special Guest: Vicky Kaushal & Yami Gautam

This episode featured the 8 Golden Buzzers of the Season from which only 4 spots will go to the Pre-Finals. 2 of the acts will be chosen by the Judges & 2 other through Public Vote.

Finals Summary 
 Golden Buzzer (Advanced Immediately to Top 5) |  Public Wildcard

Pre-Finale (India Ka Faisla) – Top 9 (23 December)

Grand Finale – Top 5 (29 December)

References 

Indian television series
Got Talent
2018 Indian television seasons